The 1980 Adelaide State of Origin Carnival was the 21st Australian National Football Carnival, an Australian football competition. It was just the second carnival to take place under the State of Origin format.

Four states took part, the hosts South Australia, Tasmania, Victoria and the reigning carnival champions Western Australia. Football Park hosted all the fixtures, which took place in October after the football season had ended.

Results

Squads

Honours

All-Australians
At the completion of the tournament, the All-Australian team was named, based on performances during the carnival.

Leading goal-kickers
 John Roberts (SA) - 9 goals
 Kelvin Templeton (VIC) - 6 goals
 Ken Judge (WA) - 5 goals
 Garry Sidebottom (WA) - 5 goals

Tassie Medalist
 Graham Cornes (SA)

References

Full Points Footy: 1980 Adelaide State of Origin Carnival

Australian rules football State of Origin
Adelaide State Of Origin Carnival, 1980